The 2002 Connecticut Huskies football team the University of Connecticut in the 2002 NCAA Division I-A football season as an independent. It was the program's first season as a full-time member at the NCAA Division I-A level. It was also the team's last season at its on-campus football stadium, Memorial Stadium. Head coach Randy Edsall was in his fourth year leading the team.

Despite winning only two of their first eight games, the Huskies finished with a record of 6–6, the first time in its short FBS history that it did not compile a sub-.500 record.  Although not selected for a bowl game, Connecticut was Bowl eligible for the first time. The turning point in the season came after a hard-fought loss at Vanderbilt.  Led by Caulley and sophomore quarterback Dan Orlovsky, the Huskies tore through the remainder of the schedule by defeating the opponents by a combined 199–55.  The winning streak began with the final two games played at Memorial Stadium.  They closed the stadium with their two highest point totals in the stadium's history (61 against Florida Atlantic, and 63 against Kent State.)  They finished the season with their first ever victory over a bowl-bound opponent by defeating Iowa State, 37–20, in Ames, Iowa.

The Huskies offense was led by consensus Freshman All-American, Terry Caulley, who led all freshman in rushing with 1,247 yards.  Despite sitting out two games with injuries, Caulley's rushing total was only 15 yards short of the team's single season record.

Schedule

References

Connecticut
UConn Huskies football seasons
Connecticut Huskies football